Bjarte Engen Vik (born 3 March 1971 in Tromsø) is a Norwegian former nordic combined athlete. He won the FIS World Cup overall twice, in 1997/98 and 1998/99 with a total of 24 wins. He also has eight medals from the FIS Nordic World Ski Championships with five golds (1997: 4 x 5 km team, 1999: 15 km individual, 7.5 km sprint, 2001: 15 km individual, 4 x 5 km team), and three silvers (1995: 4 x 5 km team, 1997: 15 km individual, 1999: 4 x 5 km team). He also won  a bronze medal in the Norwegian championship in ski jumping. His consecutive wins in the Individual Gundersen at the Nordic skiing World Championships in 1999 and 2001 were the first since Oddbjørn Hagen did it in 1934 and 1935.

Vik also found great success at the Holmenkollen ski festival, winning the Nordic combined individual event five times (1996–2000), becoming one of only four athletes to do so (Lauritz Bergendahl, Johan Grøttumsbråten, and Rauno Miettinen are the others.). He also won the Nordic combined 7.5 km sprint event at the festival twice (1997, 2000). Vik's seven career wins at the Holmenkollen are the most among any competitor in Nordic combined.

Vik received the Holmenkollen medal in 1997 (shared with Stefania Belmondo and Bjørn Dæhlie).

References

 - click Holmenkollmedaljen for downloadable pdf file 
 - click Vinnere for downloadable pdf file 

1971 births
Living people
Sportspeople from Tromsø
Olympic gold medalists for Norway
Nordic combined skiers at the 1994 Winter Olympics
Nordic combined skiers at the 1998 Winter Olympics
Holmenkollen medalists
Holmenkollen Ski Festival winners
Norwegian male Nordic combined skiers
FIS Nordic Combined World Cup winners
Olympic Nordic combined skiers of Norway
Olympic silver medalists for Norway
Olympic bronze medalists for Norway
Olympic medalists in Nordic combined
FIS Nordic World Ski Championships medalists in Nordic combined
Medalists at the 1998 Winter Olympics
Medalists at the 1994 Winter Olympics